Kateryna Tkachova (born 21 October 1998 in Kharkiv, Ukraine) is a Ukrainian synchronised swimmer. She won two bronze medals at the inaugural European Games where she was third in team and combination competitions.

References

1998 births
Living people
Ukrainian synchronized swimmers
European Games medalists in synchronised swimming
European Games bronze medalists for Ukraine
Synchronised swimmers at the 2015 European Games
Sportspeople from Kharkiv
21st-century Ukrainian women